Since their formation in 2006, American rock band Pierce the Veil has headlined 28 concert tours and appeared as a support act on 16 concert tours.

The band began touring in 2007 as a support act for other rock bands, and embarked on their first headlining tour in 2008. The band will begin their twenty-sixth headlining tour, The Jaws of Life Tour, in South America during March of 2023, with two co-headlining tours scheduled for later in the year.

Headlining

As support act

References 

Pierce the Veil concert tours